Jefferson Township is one of fourteen townships in Cass County, Indiana. As of the 2010 census, its population was 1,452.

History
Jefferson Township was organized in 1831. It was named for Thomas Jefferson, third President of the United States.

Geography
Lake Cicott is in this township.

Unincorporated towns
 Kenneth (extinct)
 Lake Cicott

Adjacent townships
 Boone (north)
 Harrison (northeast)
 Noble (east)
 Clinton (southeast)
 Liberty Township, Carroll County (south)
 Adams Township, Carroll County (southwest)
 Jackson Township, White County (west)
 Cass Township, White County (northwest)

Major highways
  U.S. Route 24

Cemeteries
The township contains two cemeteries: Davis and Zion. Davis Cemetery is located a mile east of Burnettsville and a half mile east of the White County-Cass county line, and is commonly referred to as the Davis Cemetery Burnettsville in obituaries. It was also known as the Winegardner Cemetery.

References
 
 United States Census Bureau cartographic boundary files

External links

 Indiana Township Association
 United Township Association of Indiana

Townships in Cass County, Indiana
Townships in Indiana
1831 establishments in Indiana
Populated places established in 1831